Axel Bjergne Henry Hansson (November 21, 1899 – February 8, 1952) simply known as Henry Hansen, was a Danish amateur association football player, who played 38 games and scored 10 goals for the Danish national team from 1922 to 1934. Born in Copenhagen, Hanson played as a forward for Copenhagen club B 1903. He was the younger brother of Danish international Carl "Skoma'r" Hansen, who also played for Rangers F.C. in Glasgow.

References

1899 births
1952 deaths
Danish men's footballers
Denmark international footballers
Association football forwards
Footballers from Copenhagen